"Slap It" is a single by the English electronic music band Fluke. This song is partially responsible for Fluke's reputation in the mainstream as it was featured on the soundtrack for The Matrix Reloaded under the name "Zion". An edit lasting 4:37 was subsequently included on the Puppy album as "Another Kind of Blues", not to be confused with the completely different song also titled "Another Kind of Blues" on the Xmas Demos promotional EP.

This single was never sold commercially and was only released on the Appalooso label for promotional use only.

Versions

Fluke (band) songs
2003 songs